"Rather Be" is a song by English electronic music group Clean Bandit, featuring vocals by Jess Glynne. It was released on 5 December 2013 as the fourth single from the group's debut studio album, New Eyes (2014). It also appears on the deluxe version of Glynne's debut album, I Cry When I Laugh (2015). It was co-written by band members Jack Patterson and Grace Chatto, along with Jimmy Napes and Nicole Marshall, and produced by Patterson and Chatto. Warner Music Group released a number of official remixes for download, with DJs such as All About She and Cash Cash.

The song debuted at number one on the UK Singles Chart and was the third fastest-selling single of 2014, and the highest-selling January single since "Spaceman" by Babylon Zoo in 1996. The song spent four weeks at number one, selling over one million copies since release and becoming only the seventh single to go 3× Platinum. "Rather Be" also reached number one in eleven additional countries including Austria, Finland, Germany, Norway and Sweden. It was the best selling single of 2014 in the Netherlands, was the tenth highest-selling single of the 2010s decade in the UK,  and is certified Platinum or higher in eleven countries. In the United States, the song peaked at number ten on the Billboard Hot 100. It was placed at number four on Billboards 10 Best Songs of 2014 list.

"Rather Be" has also become an international hit in part due to the song's video becoming a viral hit on YouTube. Filmed in Tokyo and featuring Haruka Abe, it has over 709 million views. It won the Best Dance Recording category at the 2015 Grammy Awards in the United States.

Background and composition
"Rather Be" was written by Clean Bandit keyboardist Jack Patterson, Nicole Marshall and James Napier (frequent collaborator of Disclosure), and was produced by Clean Bandit cellist Grace Chatto and Patterson.

"Rather Be" performs in the key of G♯ minor, in common time and at a light tempo of 121 beats per minute. It follows a chord progression of G♯m–D♯m/F♯–Emaj7–B The track's instrumentation includes a violin, chiptune-style synth blips, a slow bass, piano and vocals. According to Pandora.com, the song features a "vocal counterpoint", a subtle "buildup/breakdown", use of "modal harmonies", the use of "chordal patterning" and "staccato synths".

Release and critical reception

"Rather Be" received its first play on 4 December 2013, when it featured as BBC Radio 1 DJ Zane Lowe's Hottest Record in the World. The song's digital release date was originally planned to be 19 January 2014, but was moved to 17 January. The single was issued by Warner Music, and is the third to be taken from Clean Bandit's debut studio album. Warner Music Group also released a number of official remixes released for download, with DJs such as All About She and Cash Cash.

The song was met with critical acclaim in the music press, with both positive reviews from contactmusic and Digital Spy, who commented, "Co-penned with Disclosure hitmaker Jimmy Napes, 'Rather Be' blends classical-inspired violin with uplifting house beats and a vocal that sounds suspiciously like Natasha Bedingfield. The result is an infectious sound that feels fresh and exciting.". The song was placed at number four on Billboards 10 Best Songs of 2014 list. In December 2014, the song received a nomination for Grammy Award for Best Dance Recording, which it would go on to win in early 2015.

Commercial performance
The song debuted at number one on the UK Singles Chart, selling 163,000 copies in the first week. It was the third fastest-selling single of 2014 (behind Band Aid 30's "Do They Know It's Christmas?" and Ben Haenow's "Something I Need"), and the highest-selling January single since "Spaceman" by Babylon Zoo in 1996. It stayed there for four weeks, the longest UK number one for three years. It is the second best-selling song of 2014 in the UK, selling over 1.13 million copies by the end of the year. On the US Billboard Hot 100, the song peaked at number ten, marking Clean Bandit's and Glynne's first US top 10. The song was a remarkable success worldwide, topping the charts in 13 different countries.

Upon its release "Rather Be" held the record for the most streams in a single week on Spotify in the United Kingdom. The track received 1.09 million plays over seven days in February 2014, surpassing the record previously held by Daft Punk's "Get Lucky", although this record has now been surpassed.

In August 2015, the British Phonographic Industry certified the song 3× Platinum (the sixth song of the century to achieve this). It stayed in the top 75 for 73 weeks, setting the record for the longest unbroken run (since equalled by "Thinking Out Loud" by Ed Sheeran).  As of September 2017, the song has sold in the UK 1,283,000 copies in pure sales, it also gained 93 million in streams, making a total of 2,219,000 in combined units.

Music video
The music video was directed by the group and was uploaded to YouTube on 5 December 2013. It has since received more than 712 million views. The video was filmed in Tokyo, Japan and features Haruka Abe as a Japanese fan. During the video, Abe lip-syncs to Jess Glynne's vocals. Glynne herself also appears in the video. The band comments:

"The video is about a Japanese fan of the band who becomes delirious and has hallucinations of band members and our logo appearing unexpectedly in her daily life as a chef. Filming in Tokyo was an amazing experience: we spent almost a week there and everyone was so helpful. We made it ourselves as always, which was quite scary as we've never produced anything so far away before. We had a bit of trouble filming the scene on the train though. Turns out it's considered incredibly rude to make noise on a train so when we started dancing around to the track in the carriage with the extras, it didn't go down well! Got shouted at."

Live performances
On 16 January 2014, the group performed "Rather Be" in BBC Radio 1's Live Lounge, together with a cover version of Lorde's "Royals". They performed it as part of their sets at the Summertime Ball, Glastonbury and T in the Park. They also performed at the 2015 Brit Awards nomination launch party along with their new single "Real Love".

In popular culture

 In April 2014, The 1975 covered the song while at the BBC Radio 1 Live Lounge.
 From September 2014 to December 2016, the instrumental of the song was used in Marks & Spencer food adverts, until January 2017 when the music was changed to "Shape of You" by Ed Sheeran.
 In September 2014, Coca-Cola released a commercial in the United States featuring the chorus of the song.
 In September 2014, YES Network featured the song in the closing credits montage of Derek Jeter's final season of playing Major League Baseball.
 The song was featured in the season 6 episode of Glee entitled "The Rise and Fall of Sue Sylvester". The song is performed by the members of The New Directions.
 The song was used in the Konami game, Pro Evolution Soccer 2016 as third track.
 The song is the backing music in 2016 for ads for Graton Resort and Casino in northern California.
 Mazda has used the song in an Australian commercial for the  Mazda2 vehicle.
 Jessica Mauboy covered the song on her album The Secret Daughter Season Two: Songs from the Original 7 Series (2017).
 A cover version by Marc Scibilia was featured in the 2018 Sony Pictures Animation film Peter Rabbit.
The song was featured over the closing credits to the final episode of Sense8, "Amor Vincit Omnia", with behind-the-scenes clips of the production of the show.
The instrumental version of the song was used in Amphibiland, the pilot version of Amphibia.
In the UK the song is used in TV advertisements for the travel company JET2  and the background music is played at intervals on their aircraft.
The song is set to be featured on the upcoming 2022 dance rhythm game Just Dance 2023 Edition.

Track listing

Credits and personnel
Credits adapted from "Rather Be" CD single liner notes.

Musicians

 Jack Patterson – keyboards, piano
 Grace Chatto – cello
 Luke Patterson – drums
 Anthony Strong – piano
 Asher Zaccardelli – viola
 Beatrice Philips – violin
 Neil Amin-Smith – violin
 Florence Rawlings – vocals
  – vocals

Technical

 Jack Patterson – producer, mixer
 Grace Chatto – producer
 Lewis Hopkin – mastering
 Wez Clarke – mixer
 Liam Nolan – engineer
 Brett Shaw – engineer (album version, mistakenly uncredited on single version)

Accolades

Charts

Weekly charts

Year-end charts

Decade-end charts

All-time charts

Certifications

Release history

References

Clean Bandit songs
Jess Glynne songs
2014 singles
Warner Music Group singles
Irish Singles Chart number-one singles
UK Singles Chart number-one singles
Dutch Top 40 number-one singles
Japan in non-Japanese culture
Number-one singles in Austria
Number-one singles in Finland
Number-one singles in Germany
Number-one singles in Israel
Number-one singles in Norway
Number-one singles in Poland
Number-one singles in Scotland
Number-one singles in Sweden
Songs about Japan
Dance-pop songs
Synth-pop ballads
Big Beat Records (American record label) singles
2013 songs
Grammy Award for Best Dance Recording
Songs written by Jimmy Napes
Songs written by Grace Chatto
Songs written by Jack Patterson (Clean Bandit)